Philip Fox La Follette (May 8, 1897August 18, 1965) was an American politician. He was the 27th and 29th Governor of Wisconsin, as well as one of the founders of the Wisconsin Progressive Party.

Early life and family
La Follette was born in Madison, Wisconsin, a member of the politically prominent La Follette family. He was the son of Wisconsin Congressman, Governor, and U.S. Senator Robert M. "Fighting Bob" La Follette, Sr., and Belle Case La Follette, brother of U.S. Senator Robert M. La Follette, Jr., brother of Fola La Follette, whose husband was the playwright George Middleton, and uncle of Wisconsin Attorney General Bronson La Follette.

La Follette served as a second lieutenant in the United States Army Infantry in 1918, during World War I. In 1919 he received a Bachelor of Arts degree from University of Wisconsin and in 1922 a Bachelor of Laws degree. He married Isabel Bacon (1898-1973) in 1923. They had three children: son Robert (c. 1927), and daughters Judith (c. 1929) and Sherry (1936).

Political career
He was the district attorney for Dane County, Wisconsin, from 1925 to 1927.  La Follette was Governor of Wisconsin from 1931 to 1933 and 1935 to 1939.  He was first elected as a progressive member of the Republican Party in the 1930 election.

After a defeat in the 1932 Republican Primary, however, La Follette, along with his brother, Robert M. La Follette, Jr., created the Wisconsin Progressive Party and both ran successfully under its ticket in 1934.  The gregarious governor was known as "Phil" on the streets of Madison during his governorship, much as his father had been known as simply "Bob."  His governorship saw the implementation of many of the progressive measures of the New Deal, with La Follette being responsible for the implementation of some of them on the state level before the Roosevelt Administration could do so on the national level.

La Follette was defeated seeking reelection as governor in 1938.  That spring he had attempted to launch the National Progressive Party of America in an attempt to create a national third party (as the La Follettes had helped create in Wisconsin) in anticipation of Franklin D. Roosevelt not seeking a third term for President.  The plan for a new national Progressive Party never materialized at the time, and Roosevelt soon decided to defy convention and precedent and seek a third term; La Follette never again sought public office for himself.

Later life and career
Much as his father opposed U.S. entry into World War I, Phil La Follette strongly opposed, like most other Americans, U.S. entry into World War II. Once war was declared, he abandoned his opposition and joined the U.S. Army, serving on the staff of General Douglas MacArthur. He would later spearhead a slate of delegates to the 1948 Republican National Convention supporting MacArthur's nomination for the presidency.

From 1955 to 1959, La Follette served as president of Hazeltine Electronics, and made his home in Douglaston, New York. He later returned to Wisconsin, wrote his autobiography, and was active in the State Historical Society of Wisconsin.

He died in Madison, Wisconsin.

Works
La Follette, Philip Fox, Adventure in politics: the memoirs of Philip La Follette edited by Donald Young, New York: Holt, Rinehart and Winston, 1970.

References

Further reading
 Kasparek, Jonathan. Fighting Son: A Biography of Philip F. La Follette. Madison: Wisconsin Historical Society, 2006. .

External links
La Follette Family Papers in the Library of Congress
Philip F. La Follette, Dictionary of Wisconsin History, Wisconsin State Historical Society

 
 
 

La Follette family
District attorneys in Wisconsin
Republican Party governors of Wisconsin
Lawyers from Madison, Wisconsin
Politicians from Madison, Wisconsin
University of Wisconsin–Madison alumni
University of Wisconsin Law School alumni
Writers from Madison, Wisconsin
United States Army officers
1897 births
1965 deaths
Wisconsin Progressives (1924)
Military personnel from Madison, Wisconsin
United States Army personnel of World War I
United States Army personnel of World War II
People from Queens, New York
Progressive Party (1924) state governors of the United States
20th-century American politicians
20th-century American lawyers